The 2019–20 Ukrainian First League U–19 Championship was the 4th season of the Ukrainian Junior Under 19 Championship in First League. The competition involved participation of several junior teams of the Professional Football League of Ukraine as well as some other football academies. Due to COVID-19 pandemic post season playoffs were canceled and no champion was determined.

Direct administration of the competition belonged to the Youth Football League of Ukraine. The tournament was conducted in cooperation between both Youth Football League and Professional Football League.

The season started on 11 September 2019 with 36 participants. The 2019–20 season features the first winner of the competition from Cherkasy which used to be called Cherkaskyi Dnipro and now Dnipro Cherkasy as well as other long time participants Bukovyna, Barsa, ARZ, and others.

Among newcomers there were Nyva Vinnytsia, Complex Sports School (KDYuSSh) Chempion, Sports School (DYuSSh) 26, Lider,  (SDYuSShOR) Metalurh, UFK Dnipro, Avanhard Kharkiv, and others. Among the past season participants of the "Four teams tournament" only Avanhard Kramatorsk continues to participate, while SC Dnipro-1 and Kolos Kovalivka joined the Ukrainian Premier League U–19 championship (their main squads were promoted to the Ukrainian Premier League) and Obolon-Brovar Kyiv transitioned its U–19 squad into Obolon-Brovar-2 Bucha that joined professional league competitions in the Second League.

Teams
 Debut: Nyva Vinnytsia, Chempion Kyiv, DYuSSh 26 Kyiv, Bila Tserkva, SDYuShOR Metalurh Zaporizhia, Hirnyk Kryvyi Rih, Lider Dnipro, Nikopol, Zorya-Myronivshchyny, Avanhard Kharkiv
 Returning: Olimpik Kharkiv
 Withdrawn: MFA Mukachevo, Temp Vinnytsia, SC Dnipro, VO DYuSSu Vinnytsia, ARZ Bila Tserkva, Nikopol-Obriy, Kolos Kovalivka, Kremin Kremenchuk, Holkiper Zaporizhia, Metalurh Kamianske, Kvadro Pervomaiskyi

Group stage

Group 1

Top goalscorers

Group 2

Top goalscorers

Group 3

Top goalscorers

Group 4

Top goalscorers

See also
2019–20 Ukrainian First League
2019–20 Ukrainian Second League

References

External links
 Season's results  at the Youth Football League of Ukraine
 Gold Talant, general information on all youth competitions in Ukraine
 Athletic Club Odessa. official website
 FC Lyubomir. official website
 UFC Olimpik Kharkiv. official website

First League
Junior Championship First League